The 2014 Kabaddi World Championship was the third Kabaddi World Cup held for women.
It was organised by The Government of Punjab  It was held at Punjab from 7 to 20 December 2014. Host India won the World Cup defeating New Zealand in the finals.

Teams
A total of 8 teams took part in the World Cup.

References

Kabaddi World Cup
2014 in Indian women's sport
Sport in Punjab, India
International sports competitions hosted by India
Kabaddi competitions in India